Geastrum minimum   or tiny earthstar is an inedible species of mushroom belonging to the genus Geastrum. Although rare, it is widespread in Europe, where it occurs in a range of habitats. It is a priority species in the UK, where it has been found in the sand dunes at Holkham National Nature Reserve.

The species was first described by Lewis David de Schweinitz in 1822.

Description
Fruit bodies are initially roughly spherical before the outer peridium splits to form a star with 6–11 "rays". The inner spore sac is spherical or egg-shaped, and measures . The more-or-less round spores measure 5–5.5–4–4.5 μm and have warts on their surface.

References

minimum
Fungi described in 1822
Fungi of Europe
Inedible fungi
Taxa named by Lewis David de Schweinitz